{{Speciesbox
| image = 
| status = CR
| status_system = IUCN3.1
| status_ref = <ref name="iucn status 11 November 2021">{{cite iucn |authors=Silveira, A.L., da Rocha, C., Nogueira, C. de C., Werneck, F., de Moura, G.J.B., Winck, G., Ribeiro Júnior, M.A., Kiefer, M., de Freitas, M.A., Hoogmoed, M.S., Tinôco, M.S.T., Valadão, R., Cardoso Vieira, R., Perez Maciel, R., Gomes Faria, R., Recoder, R., D'Ávila, R., Torquato da Silva, S., de Barcelos Ribeiro, S. & Avila-Pires, T.C.S. |date=2021 |title='Tropidurus imbituba |volume=2021|page=e.T49845586A154324257 |url=https://www.iucnredlist.org/species/49845586/154324257|access-date=16 December 2021}}</ref> 
| genus = Tropidurus
| species = imbituba
| authority = Kunz & Borges-Martins, 2013
}}Tropidurus imbituba'' is a species of lizard of the Tropiduridae family. It is found in Brazil.

References

Tropidurus
Reptiles described in 2013
Reptiles of Brazil
Endemic fauna of Brazil
Taxa named by Johann Baptist von Spix